Franz Oberwinkler (22 May 1939 in Bad Reichenhall, Upper Bavaria – 15 March 2018 in Tübingen) was a German mycologist, specialising in the fungal morphology, ecology and phylogeny of basidiomycetes.

Oberwinkler earned his PhD in 1965 at the Ludwig Maximilian University of Munich studying under Josef Poelt. From 1967 to 1974 he was a research assistant and lecturer at the Institute of Systematic Botany, University of Munich, becoming professor in 1972. Between 1968–1969 Oberwinkler was Scientific Expert of the Food and Agriculture Organization at the Instituto Forestal Latino-Americano in Mérida, Venezuela.

In 1974 he was appointed as successor to Karl Mägdefrau as Chair of Systematic Botany and Mycology at the University of Tübingen and from 1974 until his retirement in 2008 he was head of the University's botanic garden, Botanischer Garten der Universität Tübingen. In 2002 he became the founding editor-in-chief of the academic journal, Mycological Progress. Between 1962 and 2010 he authored and co-authored 340 publications. Oberwinkler retired in 2008 becoming professor emeritus of the university's 'Organismic Botany Group' and he continued as editor-in-chief of the journal.

He was the recipient of several awards, including the de Bary medal of the International Mycological Association (IMA) in 2010. Several fungal taxa are named in his honour including the species Amanita oberwinklerana, Sphaerobasidioscypha oberwinkleri, Thecaphora oberwinkleri, Uromyces oberwinklerianus, and the genera Oberwinkleria and Oberwinklerozyma. He was a member of the Norwegian Academy of Science and Letters from 1995.

See also
List of mycologists
:Category:Taxa named by Franz Oberwinkler

References

1939 births
2018 deaths
German mycologists
Academic staff of the University of Tübingen
People from Bad Reichenhall
Ludwig Maximilian University of Munich alumni
Members of the Norwegian Academy of Science and Letters
Presidents of the International Mycological Association